St Oswald's Church in Guiseley, West Yorkshire, England, is an active Anglican parish church in the archdeaconry of Leeds and the Diocese of Leeds.

History

The church dates back to the late-11th or early-12th century with later additions.  The church was altered significantly by architect Sir Charles Nicholson in 1909.  The church was Grade I listed on 19 September 1962.

The marriage of Patrick Brontë and Maria Branwell took place in the church on 29 December 1812.

Architecture
The church is built of squared sandstone with a graduated slate roof.  The church has a west tower and a combined nave and chancel.

See also
Grade I listed buildings in West Yorkshire
List of places of worship in the City of Leeds
Listed buildings in Guiseley and Rawdon

References

External links

Parish of Guiseley with Esholt
A church near you; St Oswald King & Martyr, Guiseley

Further reading
Liz Holt (2007) "The Parish Church of St Oswald, Guiseley - A Brief History and Guide" (Liz North) available from the church

Churches in Leeds
Listed buildings in Leeds
Anglican Diocese of Leeds
Church of England church buildings in West Yorkshire
Grade I listed churches in West Yorkshire
St. Oswald's Church